Monique Javer was the defending champion but lost in the semifinals to Akiko Kijimuta.

Belinda Cordwell won in the final 6–1, 6–0 against Kijimuta.

Seeds
A champion seed is indicated in bold text while text in italics indicates the round in which that seed was eliminated.

  Anne Minter (second round)
  Belinda Cordwell (champion)
  Ann Henricksson (first round)
  Sandra Wasserman (semifinals)
  Monique Javer (semifinals)
  Louise Allen (quarterfinals)
  Marianne Werdel (first round)
  Iwona Kuczyńska (quarterfinals)

Draw

External links
 1989 DHL Open Draw

DHL singles
WTA Singapore Open
1989 in Singaporean sport